Ayazsar is the symbol of Ayaz. It is later renamed as Hayatsar. It is given to Ayaz, Turkic slave of Sultan Mahmud Ghaznavi. This symbol of Ayaz is present in form of a road in city of Gujar Khan, Pakistan. The road is now called Hayatsar Road.

Hayatsar was the place where the army of Ghaznavi stayed after it came back from south India. It is located in the village Jairo Ratyal on a plateau and a lake which is almost dry now. The mountains of Kashmir can be clearly seen as well as the valley towards the Tarakki mountains.

References
VISIT JAIRO RATIAL

Rawalpindi District